HMS Donovan is the ninth studio album, and tenth album overall, from British singer-songwriter Donovan. It marks the second album of Donovan's children's music, after the For Little Ones portion of A Gift from a Flower to a Garden. HMS Donovan is the second double album of Donovan's career, and was released in the UK only, in July 1971 (Dawn Records DNLD 4001 (stereo)).

History

After the release of the 1970 album Open Road that Donovan recorded with the band of the same name, he and his bandmates embarked on an international tour, partially by boat. Intending to sail around the world for one year, Donovan became homesick and ended the tour early, returning to the UK where he married his longtime affection Linda Lawrence (once girlfriend of Brian Jones) in October 1970. When Linda became pregnant with their first child, Donovan began working to complete a children's album that would eventually contain recordings spanning from July 1968 to 1971.

Donovan had started to conceive of this album as early as 1968. During a session with Paul McCartney that year, he outlined the start to the album by describing an echoey pump organ and a man shouting in Italian announcing a string of circus acts that would then fade out into "The Walrus and The Carpenter". He also played "Mr. Wind" and "The Unicorn" for McCartney, who had recently finished recording "Blackbird". A demo of "Mr. Wind" was recorded after the Barabajagal sessions in a lower register and without the voice effects. The original lyrics of the song were printed on the British version of Sunshine Superman, four years before the release of HMS Donovan.

More than half of HMS Donovans tracks are traditional folk songs, hymns, and classic poems for and about children, which Donovan set to original melodies. Many of the poems were from the book, One Hundred Poems for Children compiled by Herbert Strang. Other poems come from Lewis Carroll's Alice's Adventures in Wonderland and Through the Looking-Glass.

Of Donovan's original songs, most were newly written, many while staying on the isle of Crete and along other parts of Open Road's tour. "Lord of the Reedy River" was performed by Donovan in the 1969 film If It's Tuesday, This Must Be Belgium. The album was produced by Donovan, save for "Homesickness", the record's sole electric rocker, produced by Mickie Most either from sessions in 1968 or 69, as Donovan and Most stopped working together after the Barabajagal sessions. Other songs backed by drummer John Carr and bassist Mike Thompson were recorded during the previous year's sessions for Open Road.

Some of the songs on HMS Donovan share melodies with other songs in Donovan's canon. "Jabberwocky" has an acoustic arrangement with the same melody as "Celtic Rock" from Open Road. "The Owl and the Pussycat" and "The Unicorn" also have the same melody, but bootleg recordings suggest Donovan once sang these two songs together in a medley during late 1960s live performances. Sydney Carter's "Lord of the Dance" borrows the melody from the Joseph Brackett song "Simple Gifts". "The Star" is better known as "Twinkle Twinkle Little Star".

Despite the inclusion of Donovan's minor hit "Celia of the Seals", HMS Donovan did not sell as well as his previous releases and did not appear on the UK charts. Epic Records refused to release the album in the US and Pye Records only put the album out on its subsidiary label Dawn Records in the UK. This prompted Donovan to reunite with his old producer Mickie Most to try to find a hit-making formula for his next album. The fact that sales were the lowest of Donovan's career at the time eventually led to HMS Donovan becoming the rarest and most sought-after LP of Donovan's catalogue; in the 21st Century a search of eBay reveals that original LP copies of HMS Donovan often trade hands for $100 or more, normally selling for five or ten times the price of any other Donovan LP. Copies that contain the original poster insert are especially collectable.

After this album's release, Donovan became involved in two films. First, he played the lead role in Jacques Demy's "The Pied Piper", which was released in the US on 25 May 1972. He also provided the English soundtrack for Franco Zeffirelli's Brother Sun, Sister Moon, which was released in the US on 2 December 1972.

Reissues
In January 1998, Beat Goes On Records reissued HMS Donovan (BGOCD372) on CD in the UK. The label Media Arte issued the album on CD in South Korea in 2009.

In 2020, Donovan's own label Donovan Discs remastered the album and made it available through his website in various forms at https://donovan.ie/. This is the only remastered version of the album made available to fans.

Track listingSide one"The Walrus and the Carpenter" (words by Lewis Carroll, music by Donovan Leitch) – 8:36
"Jabberwocky" (words by Lewis Carroll, music by Donovan) – 2:37
"The Seller of Stars" (words by Thora Stowell, music by Donovan) – 2:52
"Lost Time" (words by Frida Wolfe, music by Donovan) – 2:29
"The Little White Road" (words by Thora Stowell, music by Donovan) – 2:05
"The Star" (words by Jane Taylor, music arranged by Donovan) – 1:45Side two"Coulter's Candy" (traditional, arranged by Donovan) – 1:44
"The Road" (words by Lucy Diamond, music by Donovan) – 1:08
"Things to Wear" (words by Agnes Grozier Herbertson, music by Donovan) – 1:06
"The Owl and the Pussycat" (words by Edward Lear, music by Donovan) – 2:24
"Homesickness" (Donovan) – 2:31
"Fishes in Love" (Donovan) – 1:04
"Mr. Wind" (Donovan) – 2:38
"Wynken, Blynken, and Nod" (words by Eugene Field, music by Donovan) – 2:38Side three"Celia of the Seals" (Donovan) – 3:02
"The Pee Song" (Donovan) – 2:06
"The Voyage of the Moon" (Donovan) – 5:18
"The Unicorn" (Donovan) – 0:55
"Lord of the Dance" (Sydney Carter) – 2:31
"Little Ben" (Donovan) – 1:44
"Can Ye Dance" (Donovan) – 1:32Side four'
"In an Old Fashioned Picture Book" (Donovan) – 3:11
"The Song of the Wandering Aengus" (words by W. B. Yeats, music by Donovan) – 3:56
"A Funny Man" (words by Natalie Joan, music by Donovan) – 1:51
"Lord of the Reedy River" (Donovan) – 2:38
"Henry Martin" (traditional, arranged by Donovan) – 5:08
"Queen Mab" (words by Thomas Hood, music by Donovan) – 2:18
"La Moora" (Donovan) – 2:21

Personnel
 Donovan – voice, guitar, harmonica, producer
 Mary – fiddle
 Mike Thomson – bass guitar, Hammond organ
 John Carr – drums
 Danny Thompson – double bass on "Celia of the Seals"
 Cynthia – singing on "Star", "Wynken Blynken and Nod" and "Pee Song"
Technical
 Mike Bobak – engineer
 Mickie Most – co-producer on "Homesickness"
 John Patrick Byrne – paintings
 Sid Maurer – art direction

References

External links
 HMS Donovan – Donovan Unofficial Site
 

Donovan albums
1971 albums
Children's music albums
Albums produced by Mickie Most
Dawn Records albums
Music based on poems